The ME postcode area, also known as the Rochester postcode area, is a group of 20 postcode districts in South East England, within 11 post towns. These cover north central Kent, including the Medway unitary authority and the borough of Swale, plus parts of the boroughs of Maidstone, Tonbridge and Malling, and Gravesham. The letters in the postcode are derived from the name of the Medway conurbation.



Coverage
The approximate coverage of the postcode districts:

|-
! ME1
|ROCHESTER
|Rochester, Borstal, Burham, Wouldham
|Medway, Tonbridge and Malling
|-
! ME2
|ROCHESTER
|Strood, Halling, Cuxton, Frindsbury
|Medway
|-
! ME3
|ROCHESTER
|Hoo Peninsula, Higham
|Medway, Gravesham
|-
! ME4
|CHATHAM
|Chatham, Brompton, Luton, St. Mary's Island
|Medway
|-
! ME5
|CHATHAM
|Walderslade, Blue Bell Hill, Lordswood, Luton 
|Medway, Tonbridge and Malling & Maidstone
|-
! ME6
|SNODLAND
|Snodland
|Tonbridge and Malling
|-
! ME7
|GILLINGHAM
|Gillingham, Brompton, Hempstead, Bredhurst
|Medway, Maidstone
|-
! ME8
|GILLINGHAM
|Rainham, Parkwood, Twydall, Hempstead, Wigmore
|Medway
|-
! ME9
|SITTINGBOURNE
|Newington, Teynham, Iwade and Rural
|Swale
|-
! ME10
|SITTINGBOURNE
|Sittingbourne, Kemsley, Milton Regis
|Swale
|-
! ME11
|QUEENBOROUGH
|Queenborough, Rushenden
|Swale
|-
! ME12
|SHEERNESS
|Isle of Sheppey, Minster, Sheerness, Eastchurch
|Swale
|-
! ME13
|FAVERSHAM
|Faversham, Boughton under Blean, Selling and rural area
|Swale
|-
! ME14
|MAIDSTONE
|Maidstone, Bearsted, Grove Green
|Maidstone
|-
! ME15
|MAIDSTONE
| Bearsted (Madginford), Downswood, Shepway, Senacre, Maidstone Town Centre, Loose, Mangravet, Park Wood, Tovil, East Farleigh, West Farleigh
|Maidstone
|-
! ME16
|MAIDSTONE
| Barming, Allington and west Maidstone
|Maidstone
|-
! ME17
|MAIDSTONE
| Hollingbourne, Hucking, Harrietsham, Lenham, Boughton Monchelsea, Linton, Coxheath, Chart Sutton, East Sutton, Langley, Kingswood, Sutton Valence
|Maidstone
|-

! ME18
|MAIDSTONE
| Wateringbury, Mereworth, Teston, Nettlestead, West Peckham, Yalding, Laddingford
|Maidstone, Tonbridge and Malling
|-

! ME19
|WEST MALLING
|West Malling, Kings Hill, Leybourne, East Malling
|Tonbridge and Malling
|-
! ME20
|AYLESFORD
|Aylesford, Ditton, Larkfield, Eccles
|Tonbridge and Malling
|-
! ME99
| ROCHESTER
| Jobcentre Plus
| non-geographic
|}

Map

See also
Postcode Address File
List of postcode areas in the United Kingdom

References

External links
Royal Mail's Postcode Address File
A quick introduction to Royal Mail's Postcode Address File (PAF)

Postcode areas covering South East England